The 2012 Dutch National Track Championships were the Dutch national championship for track cycling. They took place in Apeldoorn, the Netherlands from December 27 to December 30, 2012.

Medal summary

Results from nkbaanwielrennen.nl

References

External links
Official event website

 
Dutch National track cycling championships
2012 in track cycling
Track cycling
Cycling in Apeldoorn